A penumbral lunar eclipse took place on 9 February 2009, the first of four lunar eclipses in 2009, and being the deepest of three penumbral eclipses. It also happened on the Lantern Festival, the first since 20 February 1989. The tables below contain detailed predictions and additional information on the Penumbral Lunar Eclipse of 9 February 2009.

Eclipse Season 

This is the second eclipse this season.

First eclipse this season: 26 January 2009 Annular Solar Eclipse

Visibility
The eclipse was not visible in the East coast of the United States, South America and southernmost Mexico, Western Africa and western Europe.  Best visibility was expected over most of Asia, the Western US, Mexico and throughout the Pacific region.

Map

Photo

Relation to other eclipses

Eclipses of 2009 
 An annular solar eclipse on 26 January.
 A penumbral lunar eclipse on 9 February.
 A penumbral lunar eclipse on 7 July.
 A total solar eclipse on 22 July.
 A penumbral lunar eclipse on 6 August.
 A partial lunar eclipse on 31 December.

Half-Saros cycle
A lunar eclipse will be preceded and followed by solar eclipses by 9 years and 5.5 days (a half saros). This lunar eclipse is related to two partial solar eclipses of Solar Saros 150.

See also 
List of lunar eclipses
List of 21st-century lunar eclipses
 :File:2009-02-09 Lunar Eclipse Sketch.gif Chart

Notes

External links 
Penumbral Eclipse of the Moon: 2009 February 09

2009-02
2009 in science